West Chicago is a station on Metra's Union Pacific West Line, located in West Chicago, Illinois. Unless otherwise announced, inbound trains use the north (side) platform and outbound trains use the south (island) platform.

As of December 5, 2022, West Chicago is served by 50 trains (26 inbound, 24 outbound) on weekdays, by all 10 trains in each direction on Saturdays, and by all nine trains in each direction on Sundays and holidays. One inbound train originates at West Chicago on weekdays.

West Chicago station lies south of the West Chicago City Hall and next to the Wilson Avenue Bridge. It is located at ground level and consists of two platforms and three tracks. Two tracks separate the side and island platforms, and one track lies south of the island platform. The island platform is accessed via a tunnel between the parking lot and the tracks. There is an unstaffed station house at the north side of the station, with a waiting room that is open from 5 a.m. to 12 p.m.

History
The original West Chicago station served the main line of the Galena and Chicago Union Railroad which never reached its western terminus before being acquired by the Chicago and North Western Railway (C&NW) in 1864. The line became part of Metra during the 1980s, while C&NW's successor.

In 1988, the West Chicago City Council announced plans to build a new commuter train station to replace a waiting room leased by the rail company at the West Chicago Community Center.

Metra budgeted $1.69 million for projects including the station building, new lighting, track drainage, and parking spaces for 200 cars. Metra allocated $235,000 of that funding to the station building. According to policy, Metra allocated only enough money to fund a standard commuter station. West Chicago added an extra $25,000 from the city's capital projects fund to alter the modern architectural style to a vintage, 19th-century look. 

The station officially opened on July 14, 1990. The opening coincided with the city's annual "Railroad Days" celebration, celebrating West Chicago's heritage as a railroad town.

A new parking lot was opened in 2001 and added more than 170 spots, doubling the commuter parking available at the station. City officials had hoped that expansion would attract more traffic to the train station and bring commercial development to the nearby downtown area. The second lot is located east of the first lot, and started to provide daily parking at $1 per day. The original parking lot was changed to permit parking only.

References

External links 

Metra stations in Illinois
Former Chicago and North Western Railway stations
West Chicago, Illinois
Railway stations in DuPage County, Illinois
1849 establishments in Illinois
Railway stations in the United States opened in 1912
Union Pacific West Line